Ayupovo (Ayıp) is a rural locality (a village) in Yunusovsky Selsoviet, Mechetlinsky District, Bashkortostan, Russia. The population was 342 as of 2010. There are 6 streets.

Geography 
Ayupovo is located 13 km south of Bolsheustyikinskoye (the district's administrative centre) by road. Sabanakovo is the nearest rural locality.

References 

Rural localities in Mechetlinsky District